Kagman High School (KHS) is one of three public high schools on Saipan, Northern Mariana Islands. It is located in Kagman, is part of the Commonwealth of the Northern Mariana Islands Public School System and opened in January 2002.  KHS serves about 645 students from the villages of Kagman, north to Capitol Hill, and all the way through to Marpi.

The mascot is the Coconut Crab, also known as the Ayuyu.

History
The school opened in January 2002.

Clubs, sports, and organizations
JROTC
Chamolinian Club
Canoe Outrigger Club/Team
Track & Field
Basketball
Volleyball
National Forensics League
Mock Trial
STUCO
Music Club
Japanese Cultural Club
Marine Biology Club
Million Dollar Scholars
Korean Cultural Club

Although, there are three public high schools on Saipan, and one each on Tinian and Rota.  On Saipan there are several very small private high schools. Saipan is a commonwealth of the United States of America.

References

External links
 Kagman High School profile at Commonwealth of the Northern Mariana Islands Public School System
 

Public high schools in the United States
High schools in the Northern Mariana Islands
Educational institutions established in 2002
2002 establishments in the Northern Mariana Islands

https://www.youtube.com/channel/UC2GqL3gOWdroCoD5g4kJmlw